Chloroclystis atroviridis is a moth in the family Geometridae. It was described by William Warren in 1893. It is found in India and Sri Lanka.

Adults are pale green, suffused with pale rufous. The forewings have indistinct blackish basal and antemedial bands with waved edges. The hindwings are whitish, with ochreous tufts.

Subspecies
Chloroclystis atroviridis atroviridis (India: Naga Hills)
Chloroclystis atroviridis perspecta Prout, 1958 (Sri Lanka)

References

External links

Moths described in 1893
atroviridis
Moths of Asia